The Refuge du Plan de l'Aiguille is a refuge in the Mont Blanc massif in the French Alps.

Mountain huts in the Alps
Mountain huts in France
Chamonix